Joseph Thomas Pardee (May 30, 1871, in Salt Lake City, Utah; † March 2, 1960, in Philipsburg, Montana) was a U.S. geologist who worked for the U.S. Geological Survey, and contributed to the understanding of the origin of the Channeled Scablands. He discovered that when the dam broke, the water flowed towards the scablands, supporting J Harlen Bretz's theory of the cataclysmic floods.

Biography
Born in Salt Lake City, Joe grew up in a mining family. The family moved to Philipsburg, Montana, when Joe was three, and his father developed the Algonquin mine. Joe's education was at Presbyterian College in Deer Lodge, Montana, and the University of California at Berkeley. After college he opened an assay office and operated a gold and sapphire mine, but a growing interest in geology led him to the USGS. He was appointed to the Survey in 1909 and retired in 1941. During 32 years of work, his investigations ranged from glacial deposits to gold deposits, from mine sites to dam sites. Joe Pardee spent most of his career on geology in the northwestern United States, with particular emphasis on Montana.  His research in Montana helped to reveal how the Channeled Scablands in the southeastern part of the U.S. state of Washington were created.

See also 
 J Harlen Bretz
 Missoula Floods

References

External links 
 

20th-century American geologists
1871 births
1960 deaths
People from Granite County, Montana
University of California, Berkeley alumni